William Berry (born 4 April 1934) is an English former professional footballer who played in the Football League for Mansfield Town.

References

1934 births
Living people
English footballers
Association football forwards
Mansfield Town F.C. players
English Football League players